Gerald Beach Brooks, 3rd Baron Crawshaw (1 April 1884 – 21 October 1946) was a British nobleman. He was a member of the House of Lords from 19 January 1929 to his death, but made no contributions or speeches.

Coat of arms

Notes

1884 births
1946 deaths
People from Long Whatton
British people of English descent
20th-century British landowners
Gerald Beach Brooks, 3rd Baron Crawshaw